Baha' Abdel-Rahman Mustafa Suleiman is a Jordanian professional footballer who plays as a midfielder for Jordanian Pro League club Al-Faisaly and Jordan national team.

Personal life and family
Baha' is married and has a son named Odai.

Club career

Selangor 

On 24 December 2021, Baha's reach agreement to join Malaysia Super League club Selangor, alongside national teammate Yazan Al-Arab for 2022 season.

International career
Baha's first match with the Jordan national senior team was against Bahrain in an international friendly on 7 September 2007 in Muharraq, which resulted in a 3–1 victory for Jordan. 

He was one of the major contributors to the arrival of the Jordan youth team to the World Youth Cup for the first time in the history of Jordanian football, which was held in Canada in the summer of 2007, and immediately after that joined its first national team.

Honors and Participation in International Tournaments

In AFC Asian Cups 
2011 Asian Cup

In Pan Arab Games 
2011 Pan Arab Games

In WAFF Championships 
2008 WAFF Championship
2010 WAFF Championship

International goals
Scores and results list Jordan's goal tally first.

See also
List of men's footballers with 100 or more international caps

References

External links 
 
 
 
 
 

1987 births
Association football midfielders
Jordanian footballers
Jordan international footballers
Living people
2011 AFC Asian Cup players
Expatriate footballers in Saudi Arabia
Expatriate footballers in Qatar
Expatriate footballers in Kuwait
Jordanian expatriate footballers
Expatriate footballers in Malaysia
Al-Faisaly SC players
Al-Ahli Saudi FC players
Al-Taawoun FC players
That Ras Club players
Najran SC players
Qatar SC players
Ohod Club players
Al-Nasr SC (Kuwait) players
Sahab SC players
Selangor FA players
Sportspeople from Amman
Jordanian Pro League players
Saudi Professional League players
Qatar Stars League players
Saudi First Division League players
FIFA Century Club
Jordanian people of Palestinian descent
2019 AFC Asian Cup players
Kuwait Premier League players
Jordanian expatriate sportspeople in Kuwait
Jordanian expatriate sportspeople in Qatar
Jordanian expatriate sportspeople in Saudi Arabia
Jordanian expatriate sportspeople in Malaysia
Malaysia Super League players